The Province of the Sudetenland was established on 29 October 1918 by former members of the Cisleithanian Imperial Council, the governing legislature of the crumbling Austro-Hungarian Empire. It consisted of German-speaking parts of Moravia, Bohemia and Austrian Silesia, and was meant to become an integral part of the newly proclaimed Republic of German Austria.

The province was originally established by the provisional government of the so-called "German Moravia", which meant to represent German interests in Moravia. The provisional capital was declared as Troppau (Opava). It mimicked a similar provincial establishment in Bohemia, where Reichenberg (Liberec) became the capital.

Along with various other German-speaking parts, these provinces were intended to eventually integrate into Austria, on the basis of Woodrow Wilson’s Fourteen Points, which emphasized the right to self-determination of peoples. This would not come to pass, however. Both the provinces of German Bohemia and German Moravia were given to the newly proclaimed Czechoslovak Republic. Czechoslovak troops occupied the province by the beginning of 1919, and the position of the said province within Czechoslovakia was confirmed by the Treaty of Saint-Germain-en-Laye, which was signed 10 September 1919.

In 1919, about 646,800 ethnic Germans lived within the province, along with about 25,000 ethnic Czechs.

The majority of ethnic Germans in all of Czechoslovakia, including what was once this province, were expelled after the Second World War.

See also
Republic of German-Austria
Origins of Czechoslovakia
Province of German Bohemia
German South Moravia
Bohemian Forest Region

References
 Adrian von Arburg (in German): Die Festlegung der Staatsgrenze zwischen der Tschechoslowakei und Deutschland nach dem Münchener Abkommen 1938. Grin Verlag, 2008, .
 Emil Franzel (in German): Sudetendeutsche Geschichte. Mannheim 1978, .

Establishments in the Republic of German-Austria
Sudetenland
States and territories disestablished in 1918
States and territories established in 1918
Former provinces
1918 establishments in Europe
1918 disestablishments in Europe